Harold John Wellington Powell (14 September 1915 – 22 November 1993) was an Australian rules footballer who played with Collingwood and Fitzroy in the Victorian Football League (VFL).

Powell later served in the Australian Army during World War II.

Notes

External links 

Harold Powell's profile at Collingwood Forever

1915 births
1993 deaths
Australian rules footballers from Melbourne
Collingwood Football Club players
Fitzroy Football Club players
People from Northcote, Victoria
Military personnel from Melbourne